Andrews Field, formerly known as Westbran Stadium, is a baseball stadium located in the city of Brandon, Manitoba, Canada.  The stadium is currently home to the Wheat City Whiskey Jacks of the summer-collegiate Expedition League.

History
Westbran Stadium, as it was originally known, was constructed in 1987 at a cost of $1.3 million.  Since its opening, the stadium has hosted a number of provincial, national, and international tournaments, including two World Under-18 Championships, two Canadian Senior Championships, and the 1997 Canada Summer Games baseball tournament.  During the 1997 Summer Games, a TSN broadcaster commented that Westbran Stadium was "as good as many Triple-A fields".

In 2007, the stadium was renamed Andrews Field in recognition of the late Neil Andrews, a long time volunteer and local baseball executive.  The ballpark was renovated and refurbished in 2019 in preparation for the Wheat City Whiskey Jacks, who began play in the Expedition League for the 2019 season.

Andrews Field was among the top eight chosen for Canada's Favourite Ballpark, a contest held in 2011 by Baseball Canada.

Major events
 1991 World Under-18 Baseball Championship
 1994 World Under-18 Baseball Championship
 1997 Canada Summer Games
 2006 Canadian Senior Baseball Championship
 2008 Canadian Senior Baseball Championship

References

External links
Andrews Field Photos at CharliesBallparks.com
Canadian Baseball Hall of Fame - 1991 National Youth Baseball Team

Baseball venues in Manitoba
Sports venues in Brandon, Manitoba
Canada Games venues
1987 establishments in Manitoba
Sports venues completed in 1987